Debra Ann Lovette is a United States Air Force Brigadier General who has director of the Department of the Air Force Integrated Resilience Office since July 2021. She previously commanded the 81st Training Wing.

References

Living people
Year of birth missing (living people)
Place of birth missing (living people)
United States Air Force generals